William Penn Taylor (October 25, 1790 – June 18, 1863) was a nineteenth-century congressman from Virginia.

Early life
Born in Fredericksburg, Virginia, October 25, 1790 the son of Congressman John Taylor. William Taylor received a limited schooling as a child.

Career
He held several local political offices in Caroline County, Virginia, including as a delegate to the Virginia Constitutional Convention of 1829-1830 where he served alongside Robert B. Taylor from Norfolk, a Brigadier General in the state militia.

Taylor was elected to the Virginia House of Delegates for the session 1830/31 from Caroline County, Virginia.

He was elected an Anti-Jacksonian to the United States House of Representatives in 1832, serving from 1833 to 1835 and being unsuccessful for reelection.

In 1845, Taylor served as a presidential elector.

Death
He died at his estate called "Hayfield" in Caroline County, Virginia June 18, 1863 and was interred in the family cemetery on the estate.

References

Bibliography

Politicians from Fredericksburg, Virginia
19th-century American politicians
National Republican Party members of the United States House of Representatives from Virginia
William P.
People from Caroline County, Virginia
1791 births
1863 deaths